Borupalem is a neighbourhood and a part of Urban Notified Area of Amaravati, the state capital of the Indian state of Andhra Pradesh. It was a village in Thullur mandal of in Guntur district, prior to its denotification as gram panchayat.

Demographics 

The average literacy rate stands at 68% percent.

Transport 

Borupalem is located on the Vijayawada and Amaravathi routes. APSRTC run buses provide transport services from Vijayawada and Amaravathi to Borupalem.

References 

Neighbourhoods in Amaravati